Red Kill Ridge is a mountain located in the Catskill Mountains of New York northeast of Denver. It is also referred to as Butternut Mountain. It is named after the nearby Red Kill. Cator Roundtop is located northwest, White Man Mountain is located north, and Red Mountain is located north of Red Kill Ridge.

References

Mountains of Delaware County, New York
Mountains of New York (state)